The 41st Japan National University Rugby Championship (2004/2005). Eventually won by Waseda beating Kanto Gakuin University 31 - 19.

Qualifying Teams
Kanto League A (Taiko)
 Waseda, Meiji University, Keio University, Teikyo University, Nihon University

Kanto League B
 Kanto Gakuin University, Hosei University, Daito Bunka University, Ryutsu Keizai University, Kinki University

Kansai League
 Osaka University of Health and Sport Sciences, Kyoto Sangyo University, Doshisha University, Ritsumeikan, Kinki University

Kyushu League
 Fukuoka

Knockout stage

Final

Universities Competing
 Waseda
 Meiji University
 Keio University
 Teikyo University
 Kinki University
 Nihon University
 Kanto Gakuin University
 Hosei University
 Tsukuba University
 Daito Bunka University
 Ryutsu Keizai University
 Osaka University of Health and Sport Sciences
 Kyoto Sangyo University
 Doshisha University
 Ritsumeikan
 Kinki University
 Fukuoka

External links
 The 41st Japan University Rugby Championship - JRFU Official Page (Japanese)
 The 41st Japan University Rugby Championship Final - JRFU Official Page (Japanese)
 Rugby union in Japan

All-Japan University Rugby Championship
Univ